The 2nd Infantry Division (2ID, 2nd ID) ("Indianhead") is a formation of the United States Army. Its current primary mission is the pre-emptive defense of South Korea in the event of an invasion from North Korea. There are approximately 17,000 soldiers in the 2nd Infantry Division, with 10,000 of them stationed in South Korea, accounting for about 35% of the United States Forces Korea personnel.

The 2nd Infantry Division is unique in that it is the only U.S. Army division that is made up partially of South Korean soldiers, called KATUSAs (Korean Augmentation to the U.S. Army). This program began in 1950 by agreement with the first South Korean president, Syngman Rhee. Some 27,000 KATUSAs served with the U.S. forces at the end of the Korean War. As of May 2006, approximately 1,100 KATUSA soldiers serve with the 2ID. There were also more than 4,748 Dutch soldiers assigned to the division between 1950 and 1954.

Denoted the 2nd Infantry Division-ROK/U.S. Combined Division (2ID/RUCD), the division is augmented by rotational BCTs from other U.S. Army divisions.

History

World War I

The 2nd Division was first constituted on 21 September 1917 in the Regular Army. It was organized on 26 October 1917 at Bourmont, Haute Marne, France.

Order of battle

 Headquarters, 2nd Division
  3rd Infantry Brigade
 9th Infantry Regiment
 23rd Infantry Regiment
 5th Machine Gun Battalion
 4th Marine Brigade
 5th Marine Regiment
 6th Marine Regiment
 6th Machine Gun Battalion
 2nd Field Artillery Brigade
 12th Field Artillery Regiment (75 mm)
 15th Field Artillery Regiment (75 mm)
 17th Field Artillery Regiment (155 mm)
 2nd Trench Mortar Battery
 4th Machine Gun Battalion
 2nd Engineer Regiment
 1st Field Signal Battalion
 Headquarters Troop, 2nd Division
 2nd Train Headquarters and Military Police
 2nd Ammunition Train
 2nd Supply Train
 2nd Engineer Train
 2nd Sanitary Train
 1st, 15th, 16th, and 23rd Ambulance Companies and Field Hospitals

Twice during World War I the division was commanded by US Marine Corps generals, Brigadier General Charles A. Doyen and Major General John A. Lejeune (after whom the Marine Corps Camp in North Carolina is named), the only time in U.S. military history when Marine Corps officers commanded an Army division.

The division spent the winter of 1917–18 training with French and Scottish veterans. Though judged unprepared by French tacticians, the American Expeditionary Force (AEF) was committed to combat in the spring of 1918 in a desperate attempt to halt a German advance toward Paris. Major General Edward Mann Lewis Commanded the 3rd Brigade as they deployed to reinforce the battered French along the Paris to Metz road. The Division first fought at the Battle of Belleau Wood and contributed to shattering the four-year-old stalemate on the battlefield during the Château-Thierry campaign that followed.

On 28 July 1918, Marine Corps Major General Lejeune assumed command of the 2nd Division and remained in that capacity until August 1919, when the unit returned to the US. The division went on to win hard-fought victories at Soissons and Blanc Mont. Finally the Indianhead Division participated in the Meuse-Argonne Offensive which ended any German hope for victory. On 11 November 1918 the Armistice was declared, and the 2nd Division entered Germany, where it assumed occupation duties until April 1919. 2nd Division returned to U.S. in July 1919.

The 2nd Division was three times awarded the French Croix de guerre for gallantry under fire at Belleau Wood, Soissons, and Blanc Mont. This entitles current members of the division and of those regiments that were part of the division at that time (including the 5th and 6th Marine Regiments) to wear a special lanyard, or fourragère, in commemoration. The Navy authorized a special uniform change that allows hospital corpsmen assigned to 5th and 6th Marine Regiments to wear a shoulder strap on the left shoulder of their dress uniform so that the fourragère can be worn.

The division lost 1,964 (plus USMC: 4,478) killed in action and 9,782 (plus USMC: 17,752) wounded in action.

Major operations

 Third Battle of the Aisne
 Belleau Wood
 Château-Thierry campaign
 St. Mihiel
 Meuse-Argonne Offensive
 Aisne-Marne offensive
 Source for World War I data and information: United States Army Center of Military History, The Army Almanac: A Book of Facts Concerning the Army of the United States, U.S. Government Printing Office, 1950, pp. 510–592.

Interwar years
Upon returning to the United States, the division was stationed at Fort Sam Houston, at San Antonio, Texas as one of three divisions to remain intact and on active duty for the entire interwar period. It remained there for the next 23 years, serving as an experimental unit, testing new concepts and innovations for the Army. The 2nd Division stationed at Camp Bullis and Fort Sam Houston, Texas was the first command reorganized under the new triangular concept of organization theory of warfare, which provided for three separate regiments in each division. Indianhead soldiers pioneered concepts of air mobility and anti-tank warfare, which served the army for the next two decades on battlefields in every corner of the globe.

The 2nd Division participated in maneuvers at Christine, Texas between 3 and 27 January 1940. It then moved to Horton, Texas for maneuvers from 26 April to 28 May 1940, followed by maneuvers at Cravens, Louisiana from 16 to 23 August 1940. It returned to Fort Sam Houston, where it continued training and refitting, until it moved to Brownwood, Texas for the VIII Corps maneuvers from 1 June through 14 June 1941 at Comanche, Texas. The division was then sent to Mansfield, Louisiana from 11 August through 2 October 1941 for the August–September 1941 Louisiana Maneuvers.

The division was transferred to the VIII Corps Louisiana maneuver Area on 27 July 1941, being redesignated as the 2nd Infantry Division in August, and remained there until 22 September 1942, whereupon the formation returned to Fort Sam Houston. They then moved to Camp McCoy at Sparta, Wisconsin on 27 November 1942. Four months of intensive training for winter warfare followed. In September 1943 the division received their staging orders, and moved to the Camp Shanks staging area at Orangeburg, New York on 3 October 1943, where they received Port Call orders. On 8 October the division officially sailed from the New York Port of Embarkation, and started arriving in Belfast, Northern Ireland on 17 October. They then moved over to England, where they trained and staged for forward movement to France.

World War II

Assignments in European Theater of Operations
 22 October 1943: Attached to First Army
 24 December 1943: XV Corps, but attached to First Army
 14 April 1944: V Corps, First Army
 1 August 1944: V Corps, First Army, 12th Army Group
 17 August 1944: XIX Corps
 18 August 1944: VIII Corps, Third Army, 12th Army Group
 5 September 1944: VIII Corps, Ninth Army, 12th Army Group
 22 October 1944: VIII Corps, First Army, 12th Army Group
 11 December 1944: V Corps
 20 December 1944: Attached, with the entire First Army, to the British 21st Army Group
 18 January 1945: V Corps, First Army, 12th Army Group
 28 April 1945: VII Corps
 1 May 1945: V Corps
 6 May 1945: Third Army, 12th Army Group

Narrative

After training in Northern Ireland and Wales from October 1943 to June 1944, the 2nd Infantry Division crossed the channel to land on Omaha Beach on D plus 1 (7 June 1944) near Saint-Laurent-sur-Mer. Attacking across the Aure River on 10 June, the division liberated Trévières and proceeded to assault and secure Hill 192, a key enemy strong point on the road to Saint-Lo. After three weeks of fortifying the position and by order of Commanding General Walter M. Robertson, the order was given to take Hill 192. On 11 July under the command of Col. Ralph Wise Zwicker the 38th Infantry Regiment and with the 9th and the 23rd by his side the battle began at 5:45am. Using an artillery concept from World War I (rolling barrage) and with the support of 25,000 rounds of HE/WP that were fired by 8 artillery battalions, the hill was taken. Except for three days during the Battle of the Bulge, this was the heaviest expenditure of ammunition by the 38th Field Artillery Battalion, and it was the only time during the 11 months of combat that 2nd Division artillery used a rolling barrage. The division went on the defensive until 26 July. After exploiting the Saint-Lo breakout, the 2nd Division then advanced across the Vire to take Tinchebray on 15 August 1944. The division then raced toward Brest, the heavily defended port fortress that was a major port for German U-boats. After 39 days of fighting the Battle for Brest was won, and was the first place the Army Air Forces used bunker busting bombs.

The division took a brief rest 19–26 September before moving to defensive positions at St. Vith, Belgium on 29 September 1944. The division entered Germany on 3 October 1944, and was ordered, on 11 December 1944, to attack and seize the Roer River dams. The German Ardennes offensive in mid-December forced the division to withdraw to defensive positions near Elsenborn Ridge, where the German drive was halted. In February 1945 the division attacked, recapturing lost ground, and seized Gemund, 4 March. Reaching the Rhine on 9 March, the division advanced south to take Breisig, 10–11 March, and to guard the Remagen bridge, 12–20 March.

The division crossed the Rhine on 21 March and advanced to Hadamar and Limburg an der Lahn, relieving elements of the 9th Armored Division, 28 March. Advancing rapidly in the wake of the 9th Armored, the 2nd Infantry Division crossed the Weser at Veckerhagen, 6–7 April, captured Göttingen 8 April, established a bridgehead across the Saale, 14 April, seizing Merseburg on 15 April. On 18 April the division took Leipzig, mopped up in the area, and outposted the Mulde River; elements which had crossed the river were withdrawn 24 April. Relieved on the Mulde, the 2nd moved 200 miles, 1–3 May, to positions along the German-Czech border near Schönsee and Waldmünchen, where 2 ID relieved the 97th and 99th IDs. The division crossed over to Czechoslovakia on 4 May 1945, and attacked in the general direction of Pilsen, attacking that city on VE Day. The division lost 3,031 killed in action, 12,785 wounded in action, and 457 died of wounds.

The 2nd Infantry Division returned to the New York Port of Embarkation on 20 July 1945, and arrived at Camp Swift at Bastrop, Texas on 22 July 1945. They started a training schedule to prepare them to participate in the scheduled invasion of Japan, but they were still at Camp Swift on VJ Day. They then moved to the staging area at Camp Stoneman at Pittsburg, California on 28 March 1946, but the move eastward was canceled, and they received orders to move to Fort Lewis at Tacoma, Washington. They arrived at Fort Lewis on 15 April 1946, which became their home station. From their Fort Lewis base, they conducted Arctic, air transportability, amphibious, and maneuver training.

Campaign participation credit
 Normandy
 Northern France
 Rhineland
 Ardennes-Alsace
 Central Europe
 Days of combat: 303

Casualties
Total battle casualties: 16,795
Killed in action: 3,031
Wounded in action: 12,785
Missing in action: 193
Prisoner of war: 786

Awards and decorations 
 Medals of Honor: 6
 Distinguished Service Crosses: 34
 Distinguished Service Medals: 1
 Silver Stars: 741
 Legions of Merit: 25
 Soldier's Medals: 14
 Bronze Stars: 5,530
 Air Medals: 89
 Distinguished Unit Citations: 16

Korean War

With the outbreak of hostilities in Korea on 25 June 1950, the 2nd Infantry Division was quickly alerted for movement to the Far East Command and assignment to the Eighth United States Army. The division arrived in Korea, via Pusan on 23 July, becoming the first unit to reach Korea directly from the United States. Initially employed piecemeal, the entire division was committed as a unit on 24 August 1950, relieving the 24th Infantry Division at the Naktong River Line. The first big test came when the North Korean Korean People's Army (KPA) struck in a human wave attack on the night of 31 August. In the 16-day battle that followed, the division's clerks, bandsmen, technical and supply personnel joined in the fight to defend against the attackers.

Shortly thereafter, the division was the first unit to break out of the Pusan Perimeter starting on 16 September and Eighth Army then began a general offensive northward against crumbling KPA opposition to establish contact with forces of the 7th Infantry Division driving southward from the Inchon beachhead. Major elements of the KPA were destroyed and cut off in this aggressive penetration; the link-up was effected south of Suwon on 26 September. On 23 September the Division was assigned to the newly activated US IX Corps. The UN offensive was continued northwards, past Seoul, and across the 38th Parallel into North Korea on 1 October. The momentum of the attack was maintained, and the race to the North Korean capital, Pyongyang, ended on 19 October when elements of the ROK 1st Infantry Division and US 1st Cavalry Division both captured the city. The advance continued, but against unexpectedly stiffening resistance. The Chinese People's Volunteer Army (PVA) entered the war on the side of North Korea, making their first attacks in late October. The Division was within  of the Manchurian border when the PVA launched their Second Phase Offensive on 25 November. During the Battle of the Ch'ongch'on River, soldiers of the 2nd Infantry Division were given the mission of protecting the rear and right flank of the Eighth Army as it retired to the south. A large number of documents, including all records from the US 2nd Infantry Division and the US 24th Infantry Regiment, were  lost during the battle, and this  made it difficult for historians to either analyze the events in detail or to assess the exact battle damage and losses incurred. However, it was later approximated that the US 2nd Infantry Division had suffered 4,037 casualties, and most of its artillery pieces, 40 percent of its signal equipment, 45 percent of its crew-served weapons, 30 percent of its vehicles were lost during the battle. Thus, the US 2nd Infantry Division was deemed to be crippled, Major General Laurence B. Keiser commander of 2nd Infantry Division was relieved from command by the end of the battle.

The Eighth Army ordered a complete withdrawal to the Imjin River, south of the 38th Parallel. On 1 January 1951, PVA troops attacked the Eighth Army's defensive line at the Imjin River, forcing them back  and allowing the PVA to capture Seoul. The PVA offensive was finally blunted by the 2nd Infantry Division on 20 January at Wonju. Following the establishment of defenses south of Seoul, General Matthew B. Ridgway ordered US I, IX and X Corps to conduct a general counteroffensive against the PVA/KPA, Operation Thunderbolt. Taking up the offensive in a two-prong attack in February 1951, the Division repulsed a powerful PVA counter-offensive in the epic battles of Chipyong-ni and Wonju. The UN front was saved and the general offensive continued.

In August 1951, the Division was on the offensive once again, ordered to attack a series of ridges that had been designated threats to the Eighth Army's line. These actions would devolve into the battles of Bloody Ridge and Heartbreak Ridge. The Division would not receive relief until October, with its infantry regiments having suffered heavy losses. The 23rd Infantry Regiment bore the brunt of the damage, having been severely mauled on Heartbreak Ridge. The 2nd Division was withdrawn after possessing both Bloody and Heartbreak Ridges, and the damage they inflicted upon the PVA/KPA that held the ridges was estimated at 25,000 casualties. Ridge warfare was not embarked upon again as a military strategy for the remainder of the war. In January 1953 the Division was transferred from IX Corps to I Corps.

After the Korean Armistice Agreement was signed on 27 July 1953, the 2nd Infantry Division withdrew to positions south of the Korean Demilitarized Zone. Soon after the armistice, 8th United States Army commander, General Maxwell D. Taylor, appointed Brigadier General John F. R. Seitz as Commander of the 2nd Infantry Division which remained on duty in Korea. Seitz commanded the division during a tense period following the armistice when both vigilance and intensive training of the Republic of Korea Army was required by the U.S. Army until the 2nd Infantry Division was redeployed to the United States in 1954.

Awards and decorations

Reorganization
After the armistice, the division remained in Korea until 1954, when it was reduced to near zero strength, the colors were transferred to Fort Lewis, Washington, Georgia and, in October 1954, the 44th Infantry Division was reflagged as the Second.

In September 1956, the division deployed to Alaska, with the division headquarters at Fort Richardson, as part of an Operation Gyroscope deployment (soldiers and families, no equipment), switching places with the 71st Infantry Division (which was reflagged as the 4th Infantry Division upon its arrival at Fort Lewis).

On 8 November 1957, it was announced that the division was to be inactivated.  However, in the spring of 1958, it was announced that the division would be reorganizing at Fort Benning.  Division elements were reorganized into two infantry battle groups (the 1-9 IN and the 1-23 IN) that would remain in Alaska as separate units, eventually reorganizing in 1963 as infantry battalions, as the 4-9 IN and the 4-23 IN, assigned to the 171st and 172nd Infantry Brigades, respectively.

In June 1958, the division was reorganized at Fort Benning, Georgia, as a Pentomic Division, having reflagged the 10th Infantry Division upon the latter's return from Germany.  The division's three infantry regiments (the 9th, 23rd and 38th) were inactivated, with their elements reorganized into five infantry battle groups (the 2-9 IN, 2-23 IN, 1-87 IN, 2-1 IN and the 1-11 IN).  Initially serving as a training division, it was designated as a Strategic Army Corps (STRAC) unit in March 1962.

In 1963, the division was reorganized as a Reorganization Objective Army Division (ROAD).  Three Brigade Headquarters were activated and Infantry units were reorganized into battalions.

Back to South Korea
In 1965 at Fort Benning, Georgia, the 2nd Infantry Division's stateside units, the 11th Air Assault Division's personnel and equipment, and the colors and unit designations of the 1st Cavalry Division, returned from South Korea, were used to form a new formation, the 1st Cavalry Division (Airmobile). The personnel of the existing 1st Cavalry Division in Korea took over the unit designations of the old 2nd Infantry Division. Thus, the 2nd Infantry Division formally returned to South Korea in July 1965. From 1966 onwards North Korean forces were engaging in increasing border incursions and infiltration attempts and the 2nd Infantry Division was called upon to help halt these attacks. On 2 November 1966, soldiers of the 1st Battalion, 23d Infantry Regiment were killed in an ambush by North Korean forces. In 1967 enemy attacks in the Korean Demilitarized Zone (DMZ) increased, as a result, 16 U.S. soldiers were killed that year.

In 1968 the 2nd Infantry Division was headquartered at Tonggu Ri and responsible for watching over a portion of the DMZ. In 1968 North Koreans continued to probe across the DMZ, and in 1969, while on patrol, four soldiers of 3d Battalion, 23d Infantry were killed. On 18 August 1976, during a routine tree-trimming operation within the DMZ, two American officers of the Joint Security Force (Joint Security Area) were axed to death in a melee with North Korean border guards called the Axe Murder Incident. On 21 August, following the deaths, the 2nd Infantry Division supported the United Nations Command in "Operation Paul Bunyan" to cut down the "Panmunjeom Tree". This effort was conducted by Task Force Brady (named after the 2nd ID Commander) in support of Task Force Vierra (named after the Joint Security Area Battalion commander).

Given the task of defending likely areas of enemy advance from the north, in 1982 the division occupied 17 camps, 27 sites, and 6 combat guard posts in strategic locations such as the Western (Kaesong-Munsan) Corridor; the Chorwon-Uijongbu Valley and other areas.

Organization 1987–1993 
In 1987–1993 parts of the division were organized as follows:
Aviation Brigade, Camp Stanley
 Headquarters & Headquarters Company
 5th Squadron, 17th Cavalry (Reconnaissance), Camp Garry Owen (M60A3 Patton main battle tanks & OH-58C Kiowa helicopters)
 1st Battalion, 2nd Aviation (Attack), Camp Stanley (AH-1F Cobra & OH-58C Kiowa helicopters)
 2nd Battalion, 2nd Aviation (General Support), Camp Stanley (UH-60A Black Hawk, UH-1H Iroquois & OH-58C Kiowa helicopters)
 Division Artillery, Camp Stanley
 Headquarters & Headquarters Battery
 1st Battalion, 4th Field Artillery, Camp Pelham (18 × M198 155mm towed howitzers; up-gunning to 24 × M198)
 8th Battalion, 8th Field Artillery, Camp Stanley (18 × M198 155mm towed howitzers; switching to 24 × M109A3 155mm self-propelled howitzers)
 1st Battalion, 15th Field Artillery, Camp Stanley (18 × M109A3 155mm self-propelled howitzers; up-gunning to 24 × M109A3)
 6th Battalion, 37th Field Artillery, Camp Essayons (12 × M110A2 203mm self-propelled howitzers & 9 × M270 MLRS)
 Battery F, 26th Field Artillery, Camp Stanley (Target Acquisition)
 Battery B, 6th Battalion, 32nd Field Artillery, Camp Mercer (attached Eighth Army unit with 2x MGM-52 Lance with W70-3 nuclear warheads)
 Battery C, 94th Field Artillery, Camp Stanley (9 × M270 MLRS)
 Division Support Command, Camp Casey
 Headquarters & Headquarters Company
 2nd Medical Battalion
 2nd Supply & Transportation Battalion, Camp Casey
 296th Support Battalion (Forward), Camp Edwards (activated 16 October 1989, first of the new support battalions (Forward), which were raised to replace the units of the Division Support Command)
 702nd Maintenance Battalion, Camp Casey
 Company C, 2nd Aviation (Aviation Intermediate Maintenance), Camp Stanley
 5th Battalion, 5th Air Defense Artillery, Camp Pelham (MIM-72 Chaparral, M163 Vulcan & FIM-92 Stinger)
 2nd Engineer Battalion, Camp Castle
 122nd Signal Battalion, Camp Casey
 102nd Military Intelligence Battalion, Camp Hovey
 2nd Military Police Company, Camp Casey
 4th Chemical Company, Camp Casey
 2nd Infantry Division Band, Camp Casey
 44th Engineer Battalion, Camp Howze

Recent times in Korea 

On 13 June 2002, a 2ID armored vehicle struck and killed two 14-year-old South Korean schoolgirls on the Yangju highway as the vehicle was returning to base in Uijeongbu after training maneuvers. Sergeants Mark Walker and Fernando Nino, the two soldiers involved, were found not guilty of negligent homicide in a subsequent General Court-martial. The deaths and court-martial were the subject of anti-American sentiment in South Korea; the two girls are annually memorialized near US military bases in South Korea to this day.

The 2nd Infantry Division is still headquartered in Korea, with a number of camps near the DMZ. Command headquarters are at Camp Humphreys in Pyeongtaek-si.

Iraq War

From November 2003 to November 2004, the 3rd Stryker Brigade Combat Team deployed from Fort Lewis, Washington in support of Operation Iraqi Freedom. In the sands of Iraq the 3rd Brigade Stryker Brigade Combat Team proved the value of the Stryker brigade concept in combat and logistics operations.

During the late spring of 2004, many of the soldiers of the 2nd Infantry Division's 2d Brigade Combat Team were given notice that they were about to be ordered to further deployment, with duty in Iraq. Units involved in this call-up included: 1st Battalion, 503rd Infantry Regiment; 1st Battalion, 506th Infantry Regiment (Air Assault); 2d Battalion, 17th Field Artillery Regiment; 1st Battalion, 9th Infantry Regiment (Mechanized); 44th Engineer Battalion; 2nd Forward Support Battalion; Company A, 102nd Military Intelligence Battalion; Company B, 122d Signal Battalion, elements of the 2d Battalion, 72nd Armor Regiment, a team from the 509th Personnel Services Battalion, and B Battery, 5th Battalion 5th Air Defense Artillery Regiment (Deployed as a combination of mechanized infantry and light infantry with two platoons of Bradley Fighting Vehicles and 1 platoon of armored HMMWVs). As a result of the short notice, extensive training was conducted by the brigade as they switched from a focus of the foreign defense of South Korea to the offensive operations that were going to be needed in Iraq. Furthermore, time was given for the majority of the soldiers to enjoy ten days of leave. This was vital: many of the soldiers had been in South Korea for a year or more with only two weeks or less time in the United States during their stay of duty. More, they were about to depart on a deployment scheduled to last at least another year. Finally, in August 2004, the brigade deployed to Iraq.

Upon landing in country, the 2d BCT was given strategic command to much of the sparsely populated area south and west of Fallujah. Their mission, however, changed when the major strategic actions began to take place within the city proper. At this time, the brigade combat team was refocused and given control of the eastern half of the volatile city of Ar-Ramadi. Within a few weeks of taking over operational control from the previous units, 2nd Brigade began suffering casualties from violent activity. Many of the units had to move to new camps in support of this new mission. The primary focus of the 2d BCT for much of their deployment was the struggle to gain local support and to minimize casualties.

The brigade was spread out amongst many camps. To the west of the city of Ar-Ramadi sat the camp of Junction City. 2ID units stationed there included: HQ 2d BCT, 2nd ID; 2–17th Field Artillery; 1–9th Infantry; 44th Engineer Battalion; Company A, 102d Military Intelligence Battalion; Company B, 122d Signal Battalion, and Company C (Medical), 2d Forward Support Battalion. To the eastern end of the city sat a much more austere camp, known as the Combat Outpost. This was home to the 1-503d Infantry Regiment. East of them but outside of the city proper itself was the town of Habbiniya and the 1–506th Infantry Regiment. Adjacent to this camp was the logistically important camp of Al-Taqaddum, where the 2d Forward Support Battalion was stationed.

For this mission, the brigade fell under the direct command not of the 2d Infantry Division, but rather under a Marine division. For the first six months while in Ramadi, the BCT fell under the 1st Marine Division. For the second half of the deployment, they were attached to the 2nd Marine Division. While the Marines do not wear unit patches on their uniforms, the units of the 2d BCT involved are authorized to now wear any of the following combat patches: the 2nd Infantry Division patch, the 1st Marine Division unit patch or the 2nd Marine Division unit patch.

The 2d Brigade Combat Team was in action in the city of Ramadi for many events, including the Iraqi national elections of January 2005. While the voting was accomplished and little to no violence was seen within the city, few voters participated (estimated to be in the 700 person range for the eastern half of the city, according to 2nd BCT officials).

The 2d BCT also built several new camps within the city. For security reasons, many are left unverified, however ones that can be confirmed include Camps Trotter and Corregidor built to ease the burden on the accommodations at Combat Outpost.

In July 2005, the brigade began to get relieved by units of the Army National Guard, as well as the 3d Infantry Division of the Regular Army. Six months into the deployment, the units of the 2d BCT were given word that they would not be returning to South Korea but, rather, to Fort Carson, Colorado in an effort to restructure the Army and house more soldiers on American soil.

From June 2006 to September 2007, the 3rd Stryker Brigade Combat Team deployed from Fort Lewis, Washington in support of Operation Iraqi Freedom. During the 3rd Stryker Brigade's second deployment to Operation Iraqi Freedom their mission was to assist the Iraqi security forces with counter-insurgency operations in the Ninewa Province. 46 soldiers from the brigade were killed during the deployment.

On 1 June 2006 at Fort Lewis, Washington the 4th Brigade, 2d Infantry Division was formed. From April 2007 to July 2008 the 4th Stryker Brigade Combat Team was deployed in as part of the surge to regain control of the situation in Iraq. The brigade assumed responsibility for the area north of Baghdad and the Diyala province. 35 soldiers from the brigade were killed during the deployment.

From October 2006 to January 2008, the 2nd Infantry Brigade Combat Team deployed from Fort Carson, Colorado in support of the Multi-National Division – Baghdad (1st Cavalry Division) and was responsible for assisting the Iraqi forces to become self-reliant, bringing down the violence and insurgency levels and supporting the rebuilding of the Iraqi infrastructure. 43 soldiers from the brigade were killed during the deployment.

SSG Christopher B. Waiters of 5th Battalion, 20th Infantry Regiment, 3d Brigade Combat Team was awarded the Distinguished Service Cross on 23 October 2008 for his actions on 5 April 2007 when he was a specialist. Shortly after, SPC Erik Oropeza of the 4th Battalion, 9th Infantry Regiment, 4th Brigade Combat Team Thus the division will be credited with the 17th and 18th Distinguished Service Cross awardings since 1975.

The 2nd Infantry Division's 4th Brigade Combat Team deployed to Iraq in the fall of 2009.

3rd Brigade deployed to Iraq 4 August 2009 for the brigade's third deployment to Iraq, the most of any Stryker Brigade Combat Team (SBCT).

War in Afghanistan

On 17 February 2009, President Barack Obama ordered 4,000 soldiers from the 5th Stryker Brigade Combat Team to Afghanistan, along with 8,000 Marines. Soldiers are being sent there because of the worsening situation in the Afghan War. These soldiers were deployed in the southeast, on the Afghanistan-Pakistan border. During deployment, 35 soldiers were killed in combat, two others were killed in accidents, and 239 were wounded. In July 2010, the 5th Stryker Brigade Combat Team was inactivated and reflagged as the 2nd Stryker Brigade Combat Team. The brigade's Special Troops Battalion was also inactivated and reflagged and the rest of the subordinate units were reassigned to the reactivated 2nd SBCT.

3rd SBCT deployed in December 2011 and served in Afghanistan for one-year. 16 soldiers from the brigade lost their lives during the deployment. They were joined by their sister Stryker brigade, the 2nd SBCT, in the spring. 2nd Brigade returned around December 2012 and January 2013 having lost eight soldiers during deployment. The 4th Stryker BCT also deployed to its first deployment to the country in fall 2012 and returned in summer 2013 having lost four soldiers.

Rogue "kill team" criminal charges

During the summer of 2010, the U.S. military charged five members of the 3rd Platoon, Bravo Company, 2nd Battalion, 1st Infantry Regiment with the formation of a "kill team", which staged three separate murders of Afghan civilians in Kandahar province. In addition, seven soldiers were also charged with crimes including hashish use, impeding an investigation and attacking a whistleblowing soldier who alerted MPs during an initially unrelated investigation into hashish use by members of the 3rd Platoon. The alleged ringleader was Staff Sergeant Calvin Gibbs.
 On 15 January 2010, Gul Mudin was killed "by means of throwing a fragmentary grenade at him and shooting him with a rifle," an action carried out by SPC Jeremy Morlock and PFC Andrew Holmes under the direction of Gibbs. Morlock allegedly told Holmes, age 19 and on his first tour of duty, that the killing was carried out for fun.
 On 22 February, Gibbs and SPC Michael S. Wagnon allegedly shot the second victim, Marach Agha, and placed a Kalashnikov next to the body to justify the killing.
 On 2 May, Mullah Adadhdad was killed after being shot and attacked with a grenade. SPC Adam C. Winfield and Gibbs were allegedly the perpetrators.

Christopher Winfield, the father of platoon member SPC Adam Winfield, attempted to alert the Army of the kill team's existence after his son explained the situation from Afghanistan via a Facebook chat. In response to the news from his son, Winfield called the Army inspector general's 24-hour hotline, the office of Sen. Bill Nelson (D-Fla.), and a sergeant at Joint Base Lewis-McChord who told him to call the Army Criminal Investigation Division. He then contacted the Fort Lewis command center and spoke to a sergeant on duty who agreed that SPC Winfield was in potential danger but that he had to report the crime to his superiors before the Army could take action.

Locations
 Camp Humphreys (Division Command) – near Pyeongtaek-si City, South of Seoul
 Camp Casey – Dongducheon City, 45 miles north of Seoul; 17 miles south of DMZ
 Camp Hovey – adjacent to Camp Casey
 Camp Castle (former) – near Camp Casey
 Camp Mobile – adjacent to Camp Casey
 Camp Stanley (former) – East of Uijeongbu
 Camp Carroll - Daegu
 Fort Lewis – Tacoma, Washington
 K-16 - South Korea near USAG Yongsan
Camp Red Cloud (former) - Uijeongbu

Current structure
 

The 2nd Infantry Division has a unique structure. There are brigades stationed in both the Republic of Korea and at Joint Base Lewis–McChord, Washington that wear the "Indianhead" shoulder sleeve insignia (SSI). The 2ID commander, however, exercises command only over the Korea-stationed units, which include the combat aviation brigade, the sustainment brigade, the attached 210th Field Artillery Brigade, and the rotational armored BCT from the U.S. The Joint Base Lewis–McChord SSI-bearing units ― two Stryker BCTs and the division artillery ― are under 7th Infantry Division. The division also has a mechanized brigade from the Republic of Korea Army under the combined-division concept.
 16th Mechanized Brigade from the Capital Mechanized Infantry Division (Republic of Korea) - will be included in division structure as part of US - ROK force integration project, although not directly attached to the division.
19th Armored Battalion 
136th Mechanized Infantry Battalion (MIB)
137th MIB
 1st Stryker Brigade Combat Team (SBCT) "Ghost Brigade" based at Fort Lewis, Washington - under 7th Infantry Division
 Headquarters and Headquarters Company (HHC)
  1st Squadron, 14th Cavalry Regiment—Reconnaissance Surveillance and Target Acquisition (RSTA)
  2nd Battalion, 3rd Infantry Regiment (Stryker)
  5th Battalion, 20th Infantry Regiment (Stryker)
  1st Battalion, 23rd Infantry Regiment (Stryker)
  1st Battalion, 37th Field Artillery Regiment (FAR)
 23rd Brigade Engineer Battalion (BEB)
 296th Brigade Support Battalion (BSB)
 2nd SBCT "Lancer Brigade" based at Fort Lewis, Washington - under control of 7th Infantry Division
 HHC
  8th Squadron, 1st Cavalry Regiment—RSTA
  2nd Battalion, 1st Infantry Regiment (Stryker)
  1st Battalion, 17th Infantry Regiment (Stryker)
  4th Battalion, 23rd Infantry Regiment (Stryker)
  2nd Battalion, 17th FAR
  14th BEB (Activated 2014/8/21)
 2nd BSB
 Division Artillery, 2d Infantry Division based at Fort Lewis, Washington - under 7th Infantry Division
  Headquarters and Headquarters Battery (HHB)
 Combat Aviation Brigade, 2nd Infantry Division "Talon Brigade" based at Camp Humphreys, South Korea
  HHC – "Warrior Knights"
  2d Battalion, 2d Aviation Regiment (Assault) (UH−60) – "Wild Card"
  3rd Battalion, 2d Aviation Regiment (General Support) (CH-47F, UH-60) – "Nightmare"
  4th Battalion, 2d Aviation Regiment (Attack) (AH-64E) – "Death Dealer"
  Company E, 2d Aviation Regiment (MQ-1C) - "Phantom"
  602d Aviation Support Battalion – "Warhorse", Task Force Ready
  5th Squadron, 17th Cavalry Regiment (Attack/Reconnaissance) (AH-64E) - "Out Front"
 210th Field Artillery Brigade based at Camp Casey, South Korea - separate brigade under operational command of 2d Infantry Division 
 HHB
  6th Battalion, 37th FAR–M270 Multiple Launch Rocket System (M270A1 MLRS)
  1st Battalion, 38th FAR- M270 Multiple Launch Rocket System (M270A1 MLRS)
 70th BSB
 U.N. Command Security Battalion, Joint Security Area
 Battery F (Target Acquisition), 333d FAR 
 579th Signal Company
 2nd Infantry Division Sustainment Brigade (Formerly the 501st Sustainment Brigade) based at Camp Humphreys, South Korea - provides sustainment support to all units in South Korea
  HHC (Camp Humphreys)
  Special Troops Battalion
  194th Combat Sustainment Support Battalion (Formerly the 194th Maintenance Battalion)
  11th Engineer Battalion (Camp Humphreys, South Korea)
  23rd Chemical, Biological, Radioligical, Nuclear (CBRN) Battalion - Independent battalion under operational command of 2d Infantry Division
 Rotational Armored Brigade Combat Team (ABCT) - Rotational brigade under operational command of 2d Infantry Division.
Since the inactivation of the 1st ABCT, 2d Infantry Division on 2 July 2015, the ABCT requirement in Korea has been filled by rotational forces from the United States on nine-month deployments.  The 3rd ABCT, 1st Cavalry Division is currently serving as the rotational brigade.  The 2d ABCT, 1st Cavalry Division conducted the first rotation from June 2015 to March 2016.  Other units that have conducted rotations include the 1st ABCT, 1st Cavalry Division (March to November 2016), the 1st ABCT, 1st Infantry Division (October 2016 to July 2017), the 2d ABCT, 1st Cavalry Division (June 2017 to March 2018), and the 1st ABCT, 3rd Infantry Division executed the March to November 2018 rotation, and 3d ABCT, 1st Armored Division from November 2018 to July 2019. The rotational ABCT was initially located at Camp Casey, but relocated to Camp Humphreys, South Korea in 2017. 
Deployment to South Korea is under the operational command of 2d Infantry Division Headquarters
 Former Associate Unit 
 81st SBCT of the Washington Army National Guard was associated with the 2ID at Joint Base Lewis–McChord under the Associated Unit Program, due the Guard brigade having transformed into a Stryker BCT. The brigade conducted its repatching ceremony to the "Indianhead" on Dec 2016. However, the 81st once again switched their affiliation in October 2020, this time directly to 7th Infantry Division, which already administratively controls all the Regular Army brigades in JBLM.

See also
 Awards and decorations of the United States Armed Forces
 List of commanders of 2nd Infantry Division (United States)
 Rhino tank

Sources

 
  Article contributed  by the Public Affairs Office, Headquarters, US Forces, Korea.

References

External links
 
 2 ID official website
 "From D+1 to 105: The Story of the 2nd Infantry Division" (World War II unit history booklet text) (PDF)
 3rd Brigade / 2nd Infantry Division homepage
 2nd US Infantry Division World War II in Normandy Combat Film DVD 
 2nd Infantry Division in Europe World War II Combat Film DVD August–October 1944

Infantry Division, U.S. 002d
002nd Infantry Division, U.S.
02
002
002
USInfDiv0002
002
002
United States
Infantry divisions of the United States Army in World War II